Catherine Cohen (born 1991) is an American comedian, actress, and singer. Her live comedy performances combine stand-up comedy with cabaret-style songs. Her first Netflix comedy special, The Twist...? She's Gorgeous, was released in 2022.

Early life 
Cohen was raised in Houston, Texas, the daughter of a Catholic mother and Jewish father. Her brother, Billy, is an actor. She began to study musical theater as a child, and later graduated from Princeton University with a degree in English. She then moved to New York City to perform stand-up and sketch comedy, taking classes at the Upright Citizens Brigade and working at the Peoples Improv Theater.

Career 
Cohen has received positive critical reception for performing comedy cabaret, and was named on "comedians to watch" lists by Vulture and Time Out in 2018. She has a monthly show at Joe's Pub called The Twist...? She's Gorgeous, which includes singing and accompaniment, and a weekly show called Cabernet Cabaret at Club Cumming. Both shows are performed with her frequent collaborator, Henry Koperski, who accompanies her on the piano. Her performances were described by Madeleine Aggeler of The Cut as "a spinning, glittery, Technicolor explosion". She also co-hosts a monthly comedy show called It's a Guy Thing with Patti Harrison and Mitra Jouhari. As an actress, she has appeared on comedy series such as High Maintenance, Broad City, Search Party, and What We Do in the Shadows.

In 2019, Cohen was a nominee for best comedian at the 11th Shorty Awards, and won the best newcomer award at the Edinburgh Fringe. Her first Netflix comedy special, also called The Twist...? She's Gorgeous, was released in 2022 based on her 2019 Edinburgh show.

Cohen hosts a weekly podcast called Seek Treatment with co-host Pat Regan. The show's first episode was July 24, 2018.

References

External links 
Official website

1991 births
American people of Jewish descent
Living people
Comedians from Texas
21st-century American comedians
American stand-up comedians
American television actresses
American women comedians
21st-century American actresses
Upright Citizens Brigade Theater performers